Attila Fekete (born 21 July 1987 in Kecskemét) is a Hungarian football defender who plays for Ceglédi VSE.

References

1987 births
Living people
Hungarian footballers
People from Kecskemét
Kecskeméti TE players
Fehérvár FC players
Tököl KSK footballers
Ceglédi VSE footballers
Association football defenders
Sportspeople from Bács-Kiskun County